CD27 is a member of the tumor necrosis factor receptor superfamily. It is currently of interest to immunologists as a co-stimulatory immune checkpoint molecule, and is the target of an anti-cancer drug in clinical trials.

Expression 
During mouse embryonic development, specific (medium) expression levels of CD27 (in addition to high cKit, medium Gata2, and high CD31 expression levels) define the very first adult definitive hematopoietic stem cells generated in the aorta-gonad-mesonephros region. Furthermore, CD27 is expressed on both naïve and activated effector T cells as well as NK cells and activated B cells. It is a type I transmembrane protein with cysteine-rich domains, but once T cells have become activated, a soluble form of CD27 can be shed.

Function 

The protein encoded by this gene is a member of the TNF-receptor superfamily. This receptor is required for generation and long-term maintenance of T cell immunity. It binds to ligand CD70, and plays a key role in regulating B-cell activation and immunoglobulin synthesis.

When CD27 binds CD70, a signaling cascade leads to the differentiation and clonal expansion of T cells. The cascade also results in improved survival and memory of cytotoxic T cells and increased production of certain cytokines. This receptor transduces signals that lead to the activation of NF-κB and MAPK8/JNK. Adaptor proteins TRAF2, TRAF3, and TRAF5 have been shown to mediate the signaling process of this receptor via ubiquitination. CD27-binding protein (SIVA), a proapoptotic protein, can bind to this receptor and is thought to play an important role in the apoptosis induced by this receptor.

In murine γδ T cells its expression has been correlated with the secretion of IFNγ.

Clinical significance

As a drug target
Varlilumab is an IgG1 antibody that binds to CD27 and is an experimental cancer treatment. This agonist antibody stimulates CD27 when it binds. The drug is in early clinical trials and appears to stimulate T cells and increase production of cytokines such as interferon-gamma.

Interactions 

CD27 has been shown to interact with SIVA1, TRAF2 and TRAF3.

Mutations 
Some mutations can decrease the expression of CD27. Three such mutations, C53Y, C96Y, and R107C, are located in the cysteine-rich domains of CD27.

References

Further reading

External links